Song Mi-young (born 16 January 1975) is a South Korean handball player for Incheon Sports Council and the South Korean Republic national team.

References

1975 births
Living people
South Korean female handball players
Place of birth missing (living people)
Asian Games medalists in handball
Handball players at the 2014 Asian Games
Asian Games gold medalists for South Korea
Medalists at the 2014 Asian Games